Allophanic acid is the organic compound with the formula H2NC(O)NHCO2H.  It is a carbamic acid, the carboxylated derivative of urea.  Biuret can be viewed as the amide of allophanic acid.  The compound can be prepared by treating urea with sodium bicarbonate:
H2NC(O)NH2  +  NaHCO3  →  H2NC(O)NHCO2H  +  NaOH
The anionicconjugate base, H2NC(O)NHCO2−, is called allophanate. Salt of this anion have been characterized by X-ray crystallography.  The anion allophonate is the substrate for the enzyme allophanate hydrolase.

Allophonate esters arise from the condensation of carbamates.

References

Ureas
Functional groups
Carbamates